Wendy Asiamah Addo (born 20 February 1996), known by the stage name Wendy Shay, is a Ghanaian  singer.  In March 2021, she was among the Top 30 Most Influential Women in Music by the 3Music Awards Women's Brunch.

Early childhood 
Wendy Shay was born on 20th February 1996 in Accra, a suburb of the Greater Accra Region of Ghana. After the death of her father, she relocated to Stuttgart, Germany with her three siblings.  Wendy's love of music grew after she lost her father when she was four years old.

She attended Morning Star School and St Martin de Porres in Accra before relocating to Stuttgart where she continued her education from grade 7 (JHS 1). She also attended a music school in Bernhausen in Germany.

Career 
Wendy Shay is a trained Nurse by profession, worked as a Midwife in the clinical field. She worked as a midwife until she moved to Ghana to pursue her musical dreams .

She was introduced to music by Rufftown Records Manager Bullet and signed in January 2018 after the untimely death of label mate Ebony Reigns. On 1 June 2018, Wendy Shay released her debut single "Uber Driver", produced by MOG Beatz. The song was released together with the official video the same day.

Wendy Shay was recently enstooled as the Ahenemba Hemaa of Gomoa Afransi in the Central Region (Ghana) with the stool name Queen Ewurabena Ofosuhemaa Shay 1.

Brand Ambassador
Wendy Shay is the brand ambassador for the Youth Employment Agency (YEA) in Ghana.

There was a controversy around Wendy being sacked as the Brand Ambassador for the Youth Employment Agency (YEA) but was later confirmed that she is still the Ambassador.

Performance 
Wendy Shay has performed at several events including Miss Ghana 2018 Finals, RTP Awards Africa 2018, BF Suma Ghana Connect 18 concert.

In December 2019, she also performed at Ghana's Afronation Music Festival. .

Her performance in Belgium at the Ghana Culture Festival 2022 was stopped by the Police.

Discography

Singles
 "Uber Driver"
 "Bedroom Commando"
 "Astalavista"
 "Psalm 35"(featuring Kuami Eugene, Sarkodie )
 "The Boy Is Mine"  (featuring Eno Barony)
"Masakra" (featuring Ray James)
"All For You"
"Shay On You"
Stevie Wonder feat Shatta Wale
All For You
Kut It
CTD
Tuff Skin Girl
Katiana (feat Razben)
Heat
Survivor
Heaven

Album 
 Shay On You
Shayning Star

Awards and nominations

References

Living people
1992 births
Ghanaian emigrants to Germany
21st-century Ghanaian women singers
21st-century Ghanaian singers
Ghanaian nurses